GBX may refer to:
 Eastern Xwla Gbe language
 The Greenbrier Companies
 An unofficial code for penny sterling